Tunisia, subtitled "The Tunisian Theater of Operations, November 1942 to May 1943", is a board wargame published by The Gamers in 1995 that is a simulation of the Tunisian campaign during World War II.

Background
Following Operation Torch that landed Allied forces in Tunisia, the forces made a run for Tunis but were met by Axis forces, leading to the Battle of Sidi Bou Zid, the Battle of Kasserine Pass, and eventually the destruction the Afrika Korps.

Description
Tunisia is a two-player wargame, the third in the "Operational Combat Series" published by The Gamers. With each game in the series, the company published a set of rules common to all the games. These were updated from game to game, but the revised rules were always backwardly compatible with previous games in the series.

Components
The game box contains: 
two 22" x 34" paper hex grid maps, scaled at 8 km (5 mi) per hex
780 die-cut counters
40-page rule book with rules common to all games in this series
24-page rule book with rules sspecific to this game
2 Charts & Tables booklet 
counter strage tray
two 6-sided dice

Gameplay
The game begins with just a few counters on the board. As reviewer Keith Martens noted, it is a complex rules system, and this allows new players to learn the game with relatively few forces to marshall. As the game progresses into mid-1943, major reinforcements become available to both players. The games in the "Operational Combat Series" were notable for their lack of a zone of control rule. In most wargames, a unit must stop when crossing into an opponent's zone of control, and then must engage in combat. This stricture does not exist in Tunisia or its sister games.

Publication history
In 1992, The Gamers published Guderian's Blitzkrieg: The Drive on Moscow, the first wargame in the "Operational Combate Series", and a finalist for two Charles S. Roberts Awards. This was followed in 1994 by Enemy at the Gates, which won a Charles S. Roberts Award for "Best World War II Board Game of 1994". For the third game of the sermon, Dean Essig designed Tunisia and also created the artwork for it.

In 2001, The Gamers was taken over by Multi-Man Publishing, who revised and republished this game as Tunisia II in 2016.

Reception
In Issue 44 of The Canadian Wargaming Journal, Keith Martens said the "intricate yet slick" combat rules and the lack of zone of control rules "make these games different than any other on the market." He liked the small number of counters at the start of the game, pointing out that it made the game accessible to new players, and "really speeds the turns along." Martens concluded, "This is a fine addition to one of the best series in gaming and becomes in my opinion the best game on Tunisia, it is a first class simulation with tension and fun to play."  

Game designer and reviewer Richard Berg disagreed with the lack of zone of control, and found the game very long, but admitted that "it is fun. It's also good to look at." Berg found the rules "fairly easy to assimilate" despite their complexity, but noted the combat system "produces lots of results, few of which seem, to me, to reflect reality." He also found the air system "arcane". Overall, he gave the game a strong recommendation, saying, "Tunisia is a really fun game to play. [...] The best operational level WWII system around, even with its game length and obscurities, and this is the best game in that system. Buy it, Play it. Enjoy it."

Awards
Tunisia was the winner of the Charles S. Roberts Award for "Best World War II Board Game of 1995", and was a finalist for "Best Wargaming Graphics of 1995".

References

Wargames introduced in the 1990s
World War II board wargames